Lecanora impudens is a species of crustose lichen in the family Lecanoraceae. It was described as new to science by Gunnar Degelius in 1944.

Lecanora impudens is a known host species to lichenicolous fungi, including Carbonea aggregantula and Dactylospora homoclinella.

See also
List of Lecanora species

References

Lichen species
Lichens described in 1944
Lichens of North America
impudens
Taxa named by Gunnar Degelius